Iraqi Maqam is a genre of Arabic maqam music found in Iraq. The roots of modern Iraqi maqam can be traced as far back as the Abbasid Caliphate, when that large empire was controlled from Baghdad. The ensemble of instruments used in this genre, called Al Chalghi al Baghdadi, includes a qari'  (singer), santur, goblet drum, joza,  cello, and sometimes oud and naqqarat. The focus is on the poem sung in classical Arabic or an Iraqi dialect (then called zuhayri). A complete maqam concert is known as fasl (plural fusul) and is named after the first maqam: Bayat, Hijaz, Rast, Nawa, or Husayni. 

A typical performance includes the following sections:
tahrir, sometimes badwah
taslum
finalis
Maqama texts are often derived from classical Arabic poetry, such as by  al-Mutanabbi, Jawahiri, al-Mutanabbi and Abu Nuwas. Some performers used traditional sources translated into the dialect of Baghdad, and still others use Arabic, Turkish, Armenian, Hebrew, Turkmen, Aramaic or Persian language lyrics. Due to Iraq's to diversity, different ethnic groups use this genre in their own language.

Famous maqam singers
There are many maqam iraqi singers including:

 Ahmed Zaydan
 Rashid Qundarchi
 Mohammad Qubbanchi
 Hussein al-A'dhami
 Najm al-Shaykhli
 Hassan Khaiwka
 Hashim al-Rejab
 Yusuf Omar
 Farida Mohammad Ali
 Abdulrahman Khidhr
 Hamed al-Sa‘di
 Nazem Al-Ghazali
 Filfel Gourgy
 Affifa Iskandar
 Mulla Hasan al-Babujachi
 Rahmat Allah Shiltagh
 Khalil Rabbaz
 Rahmain Niftar
 Rubin Rajwan
 Mulla Uthman al-Mawsili
 Jamil al-Baghdadi
 Salman Moshe
 Yusuf Huresh
 Abbas Kambir
 Farida al-A‘dhami

See also

 Music of Iraq

External links
Famous Iraqi Maqam Singers
Iraqi Maqam
Genres of Secular Art Music Al-maqam al-'iraqi
General information about Iraqi Maqam

References 

Iraqi music
Arabic music
Masterpieces of the Oral and Intangible Heritage of Humanity
Maqam-based music tradition